The 2021–22 Egypt Cup is the 90th edition of the oldest recognised football tournament in Africa. It started with the First Preliminary Round on 9 November 2021, and will conclude with the final.

Egyptian Premier League side Zamalek are the defending champions, having defeated Al Ahly in the final.

Teams

Round of 32
All matches were played between 10 and 28 March 2022, except matches involving teams participating in African competitions (Al Ahly, Al Masry and Zamalek) were postponed and played on 12 June and 13 June 2022. 
All times are CAT (UTC+2).

Round of 16
All times are CAT (UTC+2).

Quarter-finals
All times are CAT (UTC+2).

Semi-finals
''All times are CAT (UTC+2).

Final

The final was planned to be played on 3 February 2023 and a new date has not been announced.

References

Notes

Egypt Cup
Egypt